Kamen-na-Obi is a former airbase of the Russian Air Force located near Kamen-na-Obi, Altai Krai, Russia.

The base was home to the 96th Training Aviation Regiment with the Aero L-39 Albatros as part of the Barnaul Higher Military Aviation School of Pilots.

References

Russian Air Force bases